is a Japanese former cricketer. She was part of Japan's squad for the 2011 Women's Cricket World Cup Qualifier and the 2013 ICC Women's World Twenty20 Qualifier.

Yamamoto was part of the Japanese team that won the bronze medal in the women's cricket competition at the 2010 Asian Games in Guangzhou.

She attended Chuo University and works as bank teller.

References

1983 births
Asian Games bronze medalists for Japan
Asian Games medalists in cricket
Cricketers at the 2010 Asian Games
Cricketers at the 2014 Asian Games
Japanese women cricketers
Living people
Sportspeople from Kanagawa Prefecture
Medalists at the 2010 Asian Games